This is a list of the extreme points of the European Union — the points that are farther north, south, east or west than any other location.

Overall
 North: Nuorgam, Finland
 South: Pointe de Langevin, Saint-Joseph, Réunion, France (21° 23′ 20″ S)
 West: Pointe du Canonnier, Saint-Martin, France (63° 08′ W)
 East: Pointe des Cascades, Sainte-Rose, Réunion, France (55° 50′ 11″ E)
Note that most overseas territories of EU member countries are not part of the European Union, and therefore do not count here.

In Europe, not including overseas territories

 North: Nuorgam, Finland (70° 5′ 30″ N)
 South: La Restinga, Canary Islands, Spain (27° 38′ N)
 West: Monchique Islet, Azores Islands, Portugal (31°16′30″W)
 East: Rizokarpaso, Cyprus de jure (34° 36′ E)

or Cape Greco, Ayia Napa, Cyprus de facto (34° 5′ E)

In mainland Europe
Only including the European continent proper, i.e. mainland of the 24 member states excluding islands such as Cyprus, Malta or Ireland.
 North: Nuorgam, Finland
 South: Punta de Tarifa, Spain (36° 0′ 15″ N)
 West: Cabo da Roca, Portugal (9° 30′ W)
 East: Virmajärvi, Finland (31° 35′ E)
 Southeastern: Cape Maleas, Greece (36° 26' N", 23° 11'E)
 Southwestern: Cape St. Vincent, Portugal (37°1′30″N 8°59′40″W)
 Northwestern: Tripoint between Sweden and the Norwergian provinces of Nordland and Troms og Finnmark, near Narvik, Sweden (37°1′30″N 8°59′40″W)
 Northeastern: Same as the Northernmost point: Nuorgam, Finland

In the Schengen Area
 North: Knivskjellodden, Norway (71° 11′ 8″ N)
 South: La Restinga, Canary Islands, Spain (27° 38′ N)
 West: Monchique Islet, Azores Islands, Portugal (31°16′30″W)
 East: Virmajärvi, Finland (31° 35′ 11″E)

In the Eurozone
 North: Nuorgam, Finland
 South: Pointe de Langevin, Réunion, France (21° 23′ 20″ S)
 West: Pointe du Canonnier, Saint Martin, France (63°09'13"W)
 East: Pointe des Cascades, Réunion, France (55° 50′ 11″ E)

Altitude
The lowest natural point in the EU is Étang de Lavalduc in Southeastern Metropolitan France, at 10 m (33 ft) below sea level.

Footnotes

See also 
 Geographic centre of the European Union
 Geography of the European Union
 Extreme points of Europe
 Extreme points of Earth
 Extreme points of the Commonwealth of Nations

European Union
Geography of the European Union
European Union